Kamalabad (also Romanized as Kamālābād; also known as Kamal Abadé Jarghooyeh and Kamālābād-e Jarqūyeh) is a village in Jarqavieh Olya Rural District, Jarqavieh Olya District, Isfahan County, Isfahan Province, Iran. At the 2006 census, its population was 1,558, in 429 families.

References 

Populated places in Isfahan County